Son Volt is an American rock band formed in 1994 by Jay Farrar after the breakup of Uncle Tupelo. The band's current line-up consists of Farrar (vocals, guitar), Andrew DuPlantis (bass guitar), John Horton (guitar), Mark Patterson (drums), and Mark Spencer (keyboard, steel guitar). In addition to playing alternative rock, the band is considered a staple of the alternative country rock movement of the 1990s. The band's sound also is rooted in folk rock and Americana. The band went on an indefinite hiatus in 2001, before reforming in 2004.

History
The group formed after the alternative country rock act Uncle Tupelo broke up due to tensions between Farrar and bandmate Jeff Tweedy. After Uncle Tupelo split, Tweedy formed the alternative rock act Wilco, while Farrar decided to form another act. While forming Son Volt, Farrar met Jim and Dave Boquist during the final Uncle Tupelo tour and teamed up with former Uncle Tupelo drummer Mike Heidorn to create the band. The group performed and recorded in the Minneapolis area in late 1994 and performed its first concert at the 7th Street Entry in Minneapolis on June 16, 1995. While half of the band was rooted in the Minneapolis area, Farrar and Heidorn lived in the St. Louis area, and the band used both cities as bases for its operations during the first couple of years.

Early Years, Trace, Straightaways, and Wide Swing Tremolo
Son Volt's first album, Trace, met with critical acclaim and topped many "best-of" lists in 1995. It was a moderate commercial success; the first track "Windfall" became very popular in the alt-country scene, while the band released "Drown" as a single which charted #10 on the mainstream rock charts and #25 on the modern rock charts. By 2009, Trace had sold 297,000 copies in the United States.

1997's Straightaways featured a more alternative rock sound, leading some music critics to give negative reviews, but strong and positive reviews came from outlets such as the Orlando Sentinel and the Chicago Tribune. 1998's Wide Swing Tremolo continued in the same vein and received mostly positive reviews from music outlets. Entertainment Weekly wrote that "many of the songs ... return to the power and purity of the band’s brilliant 1995 debut, Trace."

Hiatus and Return
Farrar announced a hiatus from Son Volt after their 1999 tour. Beginning in 2001, Jay Farrar released several solo efforts that postponed further releases from Son Volt. Farrar reformed with the original members of Son Volt to record a song for a tribute album for Alejandro Escovedo. The sessions reportedly went so well that Farrar and the other band members intended to record once again in the autumn of 2004. Just prior to the sessions, however, Farrar and the other band members abruptly ended negotiations. Farrar formed a new version of the band with a different line-up and released an album on Transmit Sound/Sony Legacy, Okemah and the Melody of Riot, a folk-rock album based on protest music that had been influenced by Woody Guthrie and Bob Dylan. in 2005. That same year also saw the release of A Retrospective: 1995-2000, which gathered highlights from this era, along with previously unreleased recordings. 2006 saw the release of a live DVD, Six String Belief, which was recorded at The Orange Peel in Asheville, NC.

Band Reformed and New Music
In 2007 the band returned to an alternative rock and alt-country sound and released a studio album called The Search. The Americana- and folk-influenced album American Central Dust followed, released by Rounder Records on July 7, 2009. Their next project was a Bakersfield Sound-influenced album aptly named Honky Tonk, which was released March 5, 2013, also by Rounder Records. A large scale tour followed the release of the album. On February 17, 2017, the band released Notes of Blue on Farrar's label, Transmit Sound.

Union and Electro Melodier
The band's ninth studio album, Union, was released on March 28, 2019 on Farrar's Transmit Sound label and distributed by Thirty Tigers Records.  The album consisted of songs that were highly critical of the election of US President Donald Trump and his administration. Many of the songs were commentaries on middle-class economics, freedom of the press, and immigration. Son Volt's tenth album, Electro Melodier, was released on July 30, 2021. In early summer 2021, guitarist Chris Frame announced that he would be leaving the band to pursue other interests and was replaced by former Bottle Rockets guitarist John Horton.

Musical style
Son Volt's music ranges from quiet folk ballads reminiscent of The Freewheelin' Bob Dylan, to heartland rock in the spirit of Neil Young with Crazy Horse. The band's sound features a heavy alternative rock sound in many places, all while basing their music in mostly an Americana style.  Reviews refer to the band as alternative country pioneers, a "staple in the ALT-Country Scene" or "a cult favorite", with their music "spanning a few musical niches", but based in Americana.

Members

Current members
 Jay Farrar (guitar, harmonica, piano, vocals), formerly of Uncle Tupelo
 Mark Patterson (drums)
 John Horton (guitar), formerly of the Bottle Rockets
 Mark Spencer (keyboards, steel guitar, bass), formerly of Blood Oranges
 Andrew DuPlantis (bass guitar)

Former members
 Mike Heidorn (drums), formerly of Uncle Tupelo (original member of Son Volt)
 Dave Boquist (banjo, fiddle, guitar, lap steel) (original member of Son Volt)
 Jim Boquist (bass guitar, backing vocals) (original member of Son Volt)
 Eric Heywood (mandolin, pedal steel)
 Brad Rice (guitar on Okemah and the Melody of Riot, The Search)
 Derry deBorja (keyboards on The Search)
 Chris Masterson (guitar on American Central Dust)
 Gary Hunt (guitar, mandolin, steel guitar on Honky Tonk)
 Dave Bryson (drums on Okemah and the Melody of Riot, The Search, American Central Dust, Honky Tonk)
 Jason Kardong (pedal steel on Notes of Blue)
 Jacob Edwards (drums on Notes of Blue)
 Chris Frame (guitar on Union, Electro Melodier)

Discography

Albums

Live Albums 

 Live at the Orange Peel (2020), Transmit Sound

Compilations
 A Retrospective: 1995-2000 (2005), Warner Bros. Records/Rhino

Singles

Music videos

References

External links

Son Volt's Site
Short story review of The Search at The Wheel's Still In Spin
Features and CD reviews of Son Volt at the Country Standard Time web site
 

American country rock groups
American alternative country groups
American alternative rock groups
Musical groups established in 1994
Musical groups disestablished in 2001
Musical groups reestablished in 2004
Musical groups from St. Louis
Warner Records artists
Rounder Records artists